The Devil's Saddle is a 1927 American silent Western film directed by Albert S. Rogell and written by Marion Jackson. The film stars Ken Maynard, Kathleen Collins, Francis Ford, Will Walling, Earl Metcalfe and Paul Hurst. It is based on the story "The Devil's Saddle" by Kenneth Perkins published in Argosy, October 30-December 4, 1926. The film was released on July 10, 1927, by First National Pictures.

Cast  
 Ken Maynard as Harry Morrel
 Kathleen Collins as Jane Grey
 Francis Ford as Pete Hepburn
 Will Walling as Sheriff Morrel
 Earl Metcalfe as 'Gentle' Ladley
 Paul Hurst as 'Swig' Moran
 Tarzan as Tarzan

References

External links
 

1927 films
1920s English-language films
1927 Western (genre) films
First National Pictures films
Films directed by Albert S. Rogell
American black-and-white films
Silent American Western (genre) films
1920s American films